William John Wainwright PRBSA (1855–1931) was a painter who spent most of his life in Birmingham, England.

Early life 
Wainwright trained at the Birmingham School of Art under the headship of Edward R. Taylor, and started his career as an apprentice at the stained-glass firm Hardman & Co. In 1879, Wainwright founded the Birmingham Art Circle with four other artists including Walter Langley.

The Royal Birmingham Society of Artists 

Wainwright was associated with the Royal Birmingham Society of Artists (RBSA) for 50 years until his death in 1931.  On 12 March 1881 Wainwright was elected, with Langley and others, an associate member of the Royal Birmingham Society of Artists.  During that time he achieved a number of ‘firsts’ being one of the first Associate members in 1881, the first President chosen from the ranks of the membership in 1927, and the first to have a solo exhibition of his works in 1928.

References

External links

People from Birmingham, West Midlands
19th-century English painters
English male painters
1855 births
1931 deaths
Members and Associates of the Royal Birmingham Society of Artists
20th-century English painters
20th-century English male artists
19th-century English male artists